Cabaret Voltaire may refer to:
Cabaret Voltaire (Zurich), a Swiss cabaret founded in 1916, distinguished by the involvement of Dada artists
Cabaret Voltaire (band), a British industrial/techno musical group
Cabaret Voltaire (magazine), a Dada magazine published in 1916 in Zurich
Cabaret Voltaire, a 1916 painting by Marcel Janco
Cabaret Voltaire, a Houston, Texas punk club